Men's Greco-Roman 55 kg competition at the 2010 Commonwealth Games in New Delhi, India, was held on 6 October at the Indira Gandhi Arena.

Medalists

Bracket

Repechage

References

Wrestling at the 2010 Commonwealth Games

mr:२०१० राष्ट्रकुल खेळामधील कुस्ती – पुरुष ग्रेको-रोमन ६० कि.ग्रा.